Pongamia oil is derived from the seeds of the Millettia pinnata tree, which is native to tropical and temperate Asia. Millettia pinnata, also known as Pongamia pinnata or Pongamia glabra, is common throughout Asia and thus has many different names in different languages, many of which have come to be used in English to describe the seed oil derived from M. pinnata; Pongamia is often used as the generic name for the tree and is derived from the genus the tree was originally placed in. Other names for this oil include honge oil, kanuga oil, karanja oil, and pungai oil.

Cultivation

Millettia pinnata is native to South and Southeast Asia. Known in various languages as Indian beech, pongam, karanja, honge, kanuga, pongu and naktamala, it is now grown all over the world. Typically the plant starts yielding pods from the fifth year on with the yields increasing each year until it stabilizes around the tenth year. Historically the pods are removed from the trees by beating the branches with sticks and decorticated using mallets or stones. Research is ongoing into mechanical harvesting methods.

The basic nutritional components of Millettia pinnata seeds may change depending on the season and maturity of the tree but in general are as follows:

Description
Pongamia oil is extracted from the seeds by expeller pressing, cold pressing, or solvent extraction. The oil is yellowish-orange to brown in color. It has a high content of triglycerides, and its disagreeable taste and odor are due to bitter flavonoid constituents including karanjin, pongamol, tannin and karanjachromene.

Millettia pinnata has a number of different varieties but little research has been published on the differences between them. This combined with variances in soil and weather can change the specific composition of Pongamia oil. Typically Pongamia oil is composed of the following fatty acids:

The physical properties of crude pongamia oil are as follows:

Uses

Traditional
It has been used as lamp oil, in leather tanning, in soap making, and as a lubricant for thousands of years. Its toxicity, as well as its color, bitter taste, and disagreeable odour, keep it from being used in cooking, but it does have uses in traditional medicine for treating skin disease and liver disease.

It is used as a fish poison, as the metabolites karanjin and pongamol are both toxic to fish.

Biodiesel 

Many studies have been done to convert pongamia oil into biodiesel. The following table shows the physical properties of the methyl esters of pongamia oil versus the ASTM D6751 and EN 14214 biodiesel standards:

The comparison of the methyl esters of pongamia oil to the ASTM D6751 standard for biodiesel fuels shows that processed pongamia oil is within the standards. Research has shown that jatropha or pongamia oil can be mixed with palm oil to achieve an improved low-temperature viscosity than pure palm oil and a higher oxidation stability than pure jatropha or pongamia oil. In addition, the methyl esters of pongamia oil have a cloud point of 19 °C, which is outside some country specific standards, and a pour point of 15 °C both of which would be problematic in lower temperature climates.

See also
 Energy policy of India
 Jatropha oil
 Renewable energy

References 

Traditional medicine
Vegetable oils
Biodiesel feedstock sources